The Bank of Singapore is the private banking arm of OCBC Bank. Formerly known as ING Asia Private Bank, it was acquired by OCBC Bank in 2009 from ING Group for US$1.46 billion. As of 31 December 2022, Bank of Singapore's assets under management (AUM) was US$120 billion.

The Bank of Singapore serves high net worth individuals and wealthy families in its key markets of Asia, Greater China, the Indian subcontinent and other international markets.

Headquartered in Singapore, the Bank of Singapore has branches in Hong Kong and Dubai, with a representative office in Manila. In Europe, the bank serves clients through BOS Wealth Management Europe Société Anonyme (S.A.) which is headquartered in Luxembourg and has a London office. In Malaysia, it serves its clients through BOS Wealth Management Malaysia. Bank of Singapore is rated Aa1 by Moody's.

History 
The bank was launched on 29 January 2010 by the acquisition of ING Asia Private Bank by OCBC Bank in 2009, as a result of ING's restructuring plan, following a government bailout of ING Group in 2008, due to the financial crisis in the late 2000s. Its current headquarters, the Bank of Singapore Centre at Market Street, was officially opened in June 2011. Since then, the bank has been strengthening its position in the Asia Pacific region.

In April 2016, OCBC Bank announced that Bank of Singapore, its private banking subsidiary, had acquired the wealth and investment management business of Barclays in Singapore and Hong Kong. The transaction was completed in November 2016, with US$13 billion of assets transferred to Bank of Singapore. More than 60 private bankers from Barclays joined Bank of Singapore as a result of the acquisition.

Bank of Singapore partnered the Wealth Management Institute and Nanyang Technological University to launch an Advanced Diploma in Private Banking Programme for its private bankers in May 2016.

In October 2016, Bank of Singapore announced that DZ PRIVATBANK Singapore will refer their clients to the bank as it ceases its operations in Singapore. DZ PRIVATBANK is a subsidiary of the third largest bank in Germany, DZ Bank AG.

In November 2016, Bank of Singapore received regulatory approval to operate a branch in Dubai International Financial Centre. The set-up of the branch allows Bank of Singapore to offer a range of private banking solutions including investments, credit and wealth planning advisory services to its ultra high and high net worth clients. The branch was officially opened on 19 February 2017 by the Deputy Ruler of Dubai and President of Dubai International Financial Centre His Highness Sheikh Maktoum bin Mohammed bin Rashid Al Maktoum.

In July 2018, Bank of Singapore was granted an investment company license to operate a wealth management subsidiary in Luxembourg – a first for a Singapore private bank. Bank of Singapore, through this new subsidiary, BOS Wealth Management Europe S.A., can offer a range of private banking solutions and investment advisory services to its ultra-high and high net worth clients in the European Economic Area (EEA) and the United Kingdom.

BOS Wealth Management Europe S.A. was officially launched on 1 April 2019 in Luxembourg. The official opening for its UK branch in London was held the next day.

Services 
The bank provides customised wealth management, investment and lending services, on top of general banking services provided by its parent bank, OCBC Bank. It also offers financial analysis in areas such as international equities and estate planning services.

References 

Singaporean companies established in 2010
Banks established in 2010
Banks of Singapore
OCBC Bank